Dominik Sokół (born 16 May 1999) is a Polish professional footballer who plays as a forward for Slovak club Tatran Prešov.

References

External links

Living people
1999 births
People from Radom County
Polish footballers
Association football forwards
Poland youth international footballers
Radomiak Radom players
Elana Toruń players
GKS Jastrzębie players
1. FC Tatran Prešov players
Ekstraklasa players
I liga players
II liga players
2. Liga (Slovakia) players
Expatriate footballers in Slovakia
Polish expatriate footballers
Polish expatriate sportspeople in Slovakia